

Gmina Reszel is an urban-rural gmina (administrative district) in Kętrzyn County, Warmian-Masurian Voivodeship, in northern Poland.

Villages
Apart from the town of Reszel, Gmina Reszel contains the villages and settlements of Bertyny, Bezławecki Dwór, Bezławki, Biel, Czarnowiec, Dębnik, Grodzki Młyn, Grzybowo, Kępa Tolnicka, Klewno, Kocibórz, Łabędziewo, Leginy, Łężany, Lipowa Góra, Mała Bertynówka, Mnichowo, Mojkowo, Niewodnica, Pasterzewo, Pieckowo, Pilec, Plenowo, Pudwągi, Ramty, Robawy, Siemki, Śpigiel, Śpiglówka, Staniewo, Stąpławki, Święta Lipka, Tolniki Małe, Wanguty, Widryny, Wola, Wólka Pilecka, Wólka Ryńska, Worpławki and Zawidy.

Neighbouring gminas
Gmina Reszel is bordered by the town of Mrągowo and by the gminas of Bisztynek, Kętrzyn, Kolno, Korsze, Mrągowo and Sorkwity.

References
Polish official population figures 2006

Reszel
Kętrzyn County